The Toronto Cricket Skating and Curling Club is a private sport and social club located in Toronto, Ontario, Canada. The club offers a variety of sporting and social programs including aquatics, cricket, croquet, curling, figure skating, fitness classes, lawn bowling, squash and tennis. The club also provides additional services including daycare, children's camps, health services, and social events for adults and children.

History
The history of Toronto Cricket Skating and Curling Club dates back to 1827, when the Toronto Cricket Club was founded. The Toronto Curling Club was organized in 1836 and the Toronto Skating Club sometime in the mid-eighteen hundreds. In 1957 these three clubs amalgamated into the athletic and social club it is today.

The merger was seen as beneficial for the memberships of all the clubs. The Toronto Cricket Club had struggled financially since the 1930s; the Toronto Skating Club had outgrown its premises on Dupont Street and both operated on a seasonal basis. By joining forces the new club could remain open all year-round.

After months of negotiations and careful planning by both clubs another proposal came forward. The Toronto – Victoria Curling and Bowling Club was looking for a new facility after the club's property was expropriated by the expanding University of Toronto. On 10 April 1957, the membership voted unanimously to further the recent merge with the third club and call the new entity the Toronto Cricket Skating and Curling Club.

Amalgamation was a bold step. With its success, a proud tradition of sporting excellence was not only maintained, it thrived. The Toronto Cricket Skating and Curling Club hosted such prestigious international events such as the North American Skating Championships, The Davis Cup and the Sahara Cup. Brier champions trained at the club, as did renowned skaters like Barbara Ann Scott and Toller Cranston.

In the 60 years since amalgamation, the club's membership has nearly doubled, and the regulations and facilities have evolved to meet the changing tastes of each generation. What has not changed is the original vision and pursuit of excellence that was at the heart of the Toronto Cricket Skating and Curling Club in 1957.

Athletics 
Toronto Cricket Skating and Curling Club is perhaps best known for its figure skating programme that is run by Olympic skaters Brian Orser and Tracy Wilson. The two have coached many elite-level skaters to national, international, world and Olympic titles including skaters such as Yuna Kim (2009 & 2013 World Champion, 2010 Olympic Champion, 2014 Olympic Silver medallist), Gabrielle Daleman (2018 Olympic Team Gold medallist and 2017 World bronze medallist), Evgenia Medvedeva (2018 double Olympic Silver medallist, 2016 & 2017 World Champion), Yuzuru Hanyu (2014 & 2017 World Champion and 2014 & 2018 Olympic Champion) and Javier Fernandez (2015 & 2016 World Champion and 2018 Olympic Bronze medallist).

The Toronto Cricket Skating and Curling Club hosts a number of other sports that include:
 Aquatics
 Cricket
 Croquet
 Curling
 Fitness
 Lawn Bowling
 Skating 
 Squash
 Tennis
All athletics include leagues, clinics, lessons and free play for members of the club.

References

External links
 Official website
 Ground page at ESPN CricInfo

1827 establishments in Canada
Sports clubs established in 1827
Multi-sport clubs in Canada
Curling clubs in Canada
Figure skating clubs in Canada
Clubs and societies based in Toronto